Viktor Valeryevich Bruyevich (born 8 March 1997) is a Russian professional footballer.

References

External links 
 Profile by Russian PFL
 
 

1997 births
Living people
Russian footballers
Russian expatriate footballers
Expatriate footballers in Belarus
FC Granit Mikashevichi players
Association football midfielders
Association football forwards
Belarusian Premier League players
Sportspeople from Moscow Oblast